A basement apartment is an apartment located below street level, underneath another structure—usually an apartment building, but possibly a house or a business. Cities in North America are beginning to recognize these units as a vital source of housing in urban areas and legally define them as an accessory dwelling unit or "ADU".
Rent in basement apartments is usually much lower than it is in above-ground units, due to a number of deficiencies common to basement apartments. The apartments are usually cramped, and tend to be noisy, both from uninsulated building noises and from traffic on the adjacent street. They are also particularly vulnerable to burglary, especially those with windows at sidewalk level. In some instances, residential use of below-ground space is illegal, but is done anyway in order for the building owner to generate extra income.

Homeowners will typically rent out basement apartments to tenants as a way to earn additional income so as to offset living expenses. Owning a home with a basement apartment can be an investment. Tenants will provide income to the home owner, reducing expenses, and equity will grow as the value of the property increases.


Health risks to tenants

Some health risks to people who live in basements have been noted, for example mold, radon, and risk of injury/death due to fire. It has been suggested that a basement suite is the last type of dwelling a tenant should look for because of the risk of mold. However, due to demand for affordable housing, basement suites are often the only available housing for some low-income families and individuals.

Airborne spores can cause mold to grow in damp and unventilated areas, such as basements. Presence of mold can lead to "respiratory symptoms, respiratory infections, allergic rhinitis and  asthma", as well as personal belongings being contaminated by mold.

Basement suite tenants are more likely to be injured or die due to a fire in the house. Many landlords do not follow fire code regulations, and often such regulations are not enforced by governments.source?

During flooding, these apartments are extremely dangerous. When Hurricane Ida passed over the northeast of the United States as a extratropical storm, most of the deaths were caused due to flooding in basement apartments.

Notable people

A number of noted artistic achievements have occurred in basement apartments occupied by struggling authors, painters, and musicians. Andy Warhol made one of his earliest films, Mrs. Warhol (black-and-white, 66 minutes), in the basement apartment of his house, where his mother (Julia Warhola) lived. The apartment was burgled within the first week during the six months they lived there.

See also

 English basement
 Penthouse apartment

References

Further reading
 Basements and Cellars
 Magdeburg City Immobilienmakler

Apartment types
Subterranea (geography)